The 1932 Hessian state election was held on 19 June 1932 to elect the 70 members of the Landtag of Hesse.

Results

References 

Hesse
Elections in Hesse
June 1932 events